The Lusophone Games records in athletics are set by athletes who are representing one of the ACOLOP's member federations, which involves athletes coming from Lusophone (Portuguese-speaking) countries.

Men

Women

References

External links

Lusophone Games
Lusophone Games athletics
Records